Kirkton of Bourtie stone circle is a recumbent stone circle located in Aberdeenshire, Scotland.

The circle is badly damaged, with only the eastern flanker, the recumbent and two western stones surviving. It probably weighs upwards of thirty tons. The stone sits on a slightly raised mound and is aligned with the "major southern moonset".

Some stones that may possibly be from the circle have been incorporated in a nearby gateway and wall. Fragmentary cairns are visible within the ring.

The area around the stones appears to have been used as a dump for naturally deposited stones that have been cleared off the fields. A "rude pavement" in the circle that was described in 1867 has by now disappeared entirely. This may have been the base of a now-destroyed cairn. The circle's partial destruction may well have occurred in fairly recent history. Writing in the late 18th century, the Rev Thomas Shepherd referred to the presence in the area of "three Druidical circles here, two of them pretty entire". Half a century later, only two of those remained, namely Kirkton of Bourtie and Sheldon stone circle, the latter of which was said to be in "a state of considerable preservation". By the time it was mapped by the Ordnance Survey in 1867 the Kirkton of Bourtie circle had been reduced to its present four stones; the map-makers reported, "No one [in] the parish remembers having seen it in any other condition than at present." The circle was scheduled by the Office of Works as an ancient monument in 1925, but its interior remained under the plough until as late as 1999.

References

Buildings and structures in Aberdeenshire
Archaeological sites in Aberdeenshire
History of Aberdeenshire
Stone circles in Aberdeenshire
Stone Age sites in Scotland
Scheduled monuments in Scotland